Okanin is a chalconoid. It can be found in the plant Bidens pilosa (Picao preto).

Glycosides / Acetylations
Marein is the 4'-O-glucoside of okanin.

Methylated okanin derivatives can be isolated from Bidens torta. Those include okanin 3,4,3′,4′-tetramethyl ether, okanin 3,4,3′-trimethyl ether 4′-glucoside, okanin 4-methyl ether 4′-glucoside and okanin 4-methyl ether 4′-glucoside monoacetate. Okanin 3,4-dimethyl ether 4′-glucoside can also be isolated.

References

Chalconoids